Pacific Equity Partners (PEP) is a private equity investment firm focusing on transactions in Australia and New Zealand. PEP invests across a range of industries and sectors and in turnaround and growth capital transactions.

The firm is based in Sydney, Australia, and was founded in 1998 by Rickard Gardell, Paul McCullagh, Simon Pillar and Tim Sims.  All but McCullagh previously worked together as executives at Bain & Company.

The firm has raised more than A$8 billion across five funds since its founding and has approximately A$10 billion of assets under management, making it the largest private equity firm in Australia.

Investments
PEP has led eight public to private buyout transactions in Australasia including Spotless, Patties, LifeHealthcare, Zenith Energy, and Citadel.

PEP has made more than 35 operating company investments as well as 100 bolt-on acquisitions since its founding. Among the firm's past investments are Hoyts (sold to Wanda Cinemas in 2015), Independent Liquor (sold to Asahi Breweries in 2011), Griffin's Foods (acquired from Danone in 2006 and sold to Universal Robina in 2014), Frucor (sold to Suntory in 2008), Peters Ice Cream (sold to Froneri in 2014) and Tegel Foods (acquired in 2005 from Heinz and sold to Affinity Equity Partners in 2011).

Some of the firm's current investments include Patties Foods, iNova Pharmaceuticals, medical devices group LifeHealthcare, smart metering company IntelliHUB, and Evolution Healthcare.

PEP made two acquisitions toward the end of 2019. It purchased the Asia-Pacific segment of NYSE-listed towing and trailering equipment manufacturer Horizon Global and it also acquired community energy network provider WINconnect from private operators. WINconnect is the third deal for the firm's Secure Assets Fund.

The firm realised a positive return from the sale of New Zealand honey supplier Manuka Health which it exited in 2018 for $NZ300 million. PEP first purchased Manuka in 2015 and made key changes including expanding the company's operations and leading an industry reform to standardise honey grades, allowing better transparency on quality and reducing counterfeiting. This work gained industry recognition in 2018 for quality management and responsible investing.

Other recent investment exits include the sale of Allied Pinnacle to Japan's Nissin Foods in February 2019 and the exit of NZ private education provider ACG in late 2018.

References

External links
Company website

Private equity firms of Australia
Financial services companies established in 1998
1998 establishments in Australia